The 2022 Australian Open described in detail, in the form of day-by-day summaries.

All dates are AEDT (UTC+11)

Day 1 (17 January)
Novak Djokovic was originally scheduled to play the night match on Rod Laver Arena and he was due to compete against fellow Serb Miomir Kecmanović before he was deported. His spot was replaced by lucky loser Salvatore Caruso.

 Seeds out:
 Men's singles:  Cameron Norrie [12],  Lloyd Harris [30]
 Women's singles:  Sofia Kenin [11],  Coco Gauff [18]
 Schedule of Play

Day 2 (18 January)
 Seeds out:
 Men's singles:  Nikoloz Basilashvili [21],  John Isner [22],  Ugo Humbert [29]
 Women's singles:  Angelique Kerber [16],  Petra Kvitová [20],  Leylah Fernandez [23]
 Schedule of Play

Day 3 (19 January)
 Seeds out:
 Men's singles:  Hubert Hurkacz [10]
 Women's singles:  Belinda Bencic [22],  Sara Sorribes Tormo [32]
 Men's doubles:  Marcelo Arévalo /  Jean-Julien Rojer [14]
 Women's doubles:  Nadiia Kichenok /  Sania Mirza [12],  Irina-Camelia Begu /  Nina Stojanović [15]
 Schedule of Play

Day 4 (20 January)
 Seeds out:
 Men's singles:  Diego Schwartzman [13],  Grigor Dimitrov [26]
 Women's singles:  Garbiñe Muguruza [3],  Anett Kontaveit [6],  Elena Rybakina [12],  Emma Raducanu [17]
 Men's doubles:  Nicolas Mahut /  Fabrice Martin [7],  Sander Gillé /  Joran Vliegen [11],  Andrey Golubev /  Franko Škugor [16]
 Women's doubles:  Darija Jurak Schreiber /  Andreja Klepač [7],  Coco Gauff /  Caty McNally [8]
 Schedule of Play

Day 5 (21 January)
Desirae Krawczyk was attempting to make history to complete a non-calendar-year Mixed Doubles Grand Slam in the Open Era, having won the French Open, Wimbedon and the US Open in 2021. However, she and her partner Joe Salisbury lost to Giuliana Olmos and Marcelo Arévalo in the first round.

 Seeds out:
 Men's singles:  Cristian Garín [16],  Aslan Karatsev [18],  Reilly Opelka [23],  Lorenzo Sonego [25],  Karen Khachanov [28],  Carlos Alcaraz [31]
 Women's singles:  Naomi Osaka [13],  Elina Svitolina [15],  Jeļena Ostapenko [26],  Veronika Kudermetova [28],  Camila Giorgi [30]
 Men's doubles:  Nikola Mektić /  Mate Pavić [1]
 Women's doubles:  Samantha Stosur /  Zhang Shuai [4]  
 Mixed doubles:  Desirae Krawczyk /  Joe Salisbury [1],  Nicole Melichar-Martinez /  Robert Farah [3]
 Schedule of Play

Day 6 (22 January)
 Seeds out:
 Men's singles:  Andrey Rublev [5],  Roberto Bautista Agut [15],  Dan Evans [24]
 Women's singles:  Anastasia Pavlyuchenkova [10],  Daria Kasatkina [25],  Tamara Zidanšek [29],  Markéta Vondroušová [31] 
 Men's doubles:  Juan Sebastián Cabal /  Robert Farah [4],  Ivan Dodig /  Marcelo Melo [9]
 Women's doubles:  Gabriela Dabrowski /  Giuliana Olmos [6],  Marie Bouzková /  Lucie Hradecká [10],  Lyudmyla Kichenok /  Jeļena Ostapenko [11],  Asia Muhammad /  Jessica Pegula [13]
 Mixed doubles:  Nina Stojanović /  Mate Pavić [7]
 Schedule of Play

Day 7 (23 January)
 Seeds out:
 Men's singles:  Alexander Zverev [3],  Pablo Carreño Busta [19]
 Women's singles:  Maria Sakkari [5],  Paula Badosa [8],  Victoria Azarenka [24]
 Men's doubles:  Jamie Murray /  Bruno Soares [8],  Kevin Krawietz /  Andreas Mies [12],  Ariel Behar /  Gonzalo Escobar [15]
 Women's doubles:   Xu Yifan /  Yang Zhaoxuan [14]
 Schedule of Play

Day 8 (24 January)
 Seeds out:
 Men's singles:  Taylor Fritz [20],  Marin Čilić [27],  Alex de Minaur [32]
 Women's singles:  Aryna Sabalenka [2],  Simona Halep [14],  Elise Mertens [19]
 Men's doubles:  Raven Klaasen /  Ben McLachlan [13]
 Women's doubles:  Alexa Guarachi /  Nicole Melichar-Martinez [5],  Viktória Kužmová /  Vera Zvonareva [16]
 Mixed doubles:  Alexa Guarachi /  Tim Pütz [4]
 Schedule of Play

Day 9 (25 January)
 Seeds out:
 Men's singles:  Denis Shapovalov [14],  Gaël Monfils [17]
 Women's singles:  Barbora Krejčíková [4],  Jessica Pegula [21]
 Men's doubles:  John Peers /  Filip Polášek [5],  Tim Pütz /  Michael Venus [6]
 Mixed doubles:  Ena Shibahara /  Ben McLachlan [8]
 Schedule of Play

Day 10 (26 January)
 Seeds out:
 Men's singles:  Félix Auger-Aliassime [9],  Jannik Sinner [11]
 Men's doubles:  Wesley Koolhof /  Neal Skupski [10]
 Women's doubles:  Caroline Dolehide /  Storm Sanders [9]
 Mixed doubles:  Zhang Shuai /  John Peers [2]
 Schedule of Play

Day 11 (27 January)
 Seeds out:
 Women's singles:  Iga Świątek [7]
 Men's doubles:  Rajeev Ram /  Joe Salisbury [2],  Marcel Granollers /  Horacio Zeballos [3]
 Women's doubles:  Shuko Aoyama /  Ena Shibahara [2],  Veronika Kudermetova /  Elise Mertens [3]
 Schedule of Play

Day 12 (28 January)
 Seeds out:
 Men's singles:  Stefanos Tsitsipas [4],  Matteo Berrettini [7]
 Schedule of Play

Day 13 (29 January)
Ashleigh Barty became the first home player to win the title since Chris O'Neil in 1978.
 Seeds out:
 Women's singles:  Danielle Collins [27]
 Schedule of Play

Day 14 (30 January)
 Seeds out:
 Men's singles:  Daniil Medvedev [2]
 Schedule of Play

Notes

 Day-by-day summaries
2022